The Popular Front for the Liberation of Palestine – Special Command (PFLP-SC) was a minor breakout faction from Wadie Haddad's ultraradical Popular Front for the Liberation of Palestine - External Operations (neither group should be confused with more established Palestinian factions, such as the PFLP or the PFLP-GC).

The PFLP-SC formed as a breakout organization from the PFLP-EO in 1978, the year of Haddad's death. It was never part of the Palestine Liberation Organization (PLO), and it is unclear if it had a political program. It claimed responsibility for several bomb attacks on civilians in Western Europe, possibly performed with support from Libya, Iraq or Syria. It is believed to have ceased operations in the 1980s.

Arab Nationalist Movement breakaway groups
Defunct Palestinian militant groups
Popular Front for the Liberation of Palestine
1978 establishments in the Israeli Military Governorate
1980s disestablishments in the Israeli Civil Administration area